The heats for the men's 50 metre butterfly race at the 2009 World Championships occurred on Sunday, 26 July at the Foro Italico in Rome, Italy.

Records
Prior to this competition, the existing world and competition records were as follows:

The following records were established during the competition:

Results

Heats

Semifinals

Final

External links
Heats Results
Semifinal Results
Finals Results

Butterfly Men 50
Men's 50 metre butterfly